Regency may refer to:

Government and politics
 Regency (government), the rule of a regent
 Regency (Indonesia), class of administrative subdivision inherited from the Regentschap of Dutch indirect rule
 Albany Regency, a political faction in the state of New York, c. 1820–50
 Hōjō Regency, during the Kamakura shogunate in Japan
 Régence, France 1715–23
 Regency Acts, various acts of the British parliament to provide for a regent
 Regency Era, also called "British Regency" or "The Regency", a reference to various stretches of time in the United Kingdom of Great Britain and Ireland, e.g., 1811–1820 or 1795 to 1837

Genres or styles
Distinctive trends in British architecture, culture, fashion, literature, and politics during the British Regency period, e.g.:
 Regency architecture, the architecture of the British Regency period 
 Regency novel, a novel genre set in the British Regency period
 Regency romance, a romance novel genre set in the British Regency period

Brands and enterprises

Arts, entertainment, and media
 Regency Enterprises, a Los Angeles-based entertainment company
 Regency Television, a joint venture between Regency Enterprises and Fox Television Studios
 Regency Records, a record label founded by Johnny Carter and Lamar Gravitt

Hospitality
 Hyatt Regency, a hotel brand owned by Hyatt Hotels Corporation
 Loews Regency San Francisco, California, one of the Loews Hotels
 The Regency, Denver, also known as "Regency Student Housing", in Colorado, USA, a student housing community which replaced the Regency Hotel

Other uses
 Regency (greyhounds), a category 1, UK greyhound competition
 Regency (Jesuit), a three-year period of training for candidates to the Society of Jesus, during which the men live in and share the work of a local community of the Order
 Regency (Omaha), a neighborhood in Omaha, Nebraska
 Regency, South Africa, a suburb of Johannesburg, South Africa

See also 
 Regent (disambiguation)
 Regents (disambiguation)